William J. George (October 27, 1929 – September 30, 1982) was an American professional football player who was a middle linebacker for the Chicago Bears and the Los Angeles Rams of the National Football League (NFL).

George was born in Waynesburg, Pennsylvania, about 50 miles south of Pittsburgh.  He is among numerous legendary football players born in football-rich Western Pennsylvania.  He attended college at Wake Forest University, and was the Bears' second-round draft pick in 1951. He began his pro football career the following year as a middle guard in the then-standard five-man defensive front. He was selected to play in eight consecutive Pro Bowls, from 1954 to 1961.

George is credited as the first true middle linebacker in football history and, inadvertently, the creator of the 4–3 defense.  Noting during a 1954 game with the Philadelphia Eagles that his tendency to hit the center right after the snap led to the quarterback passing right over his head, he began to drop back from the line, not only enabling him to intercept and otherwise disrupt several passes from that game forward but also creating the familiar 4–3 setup (four linemen and three linebackers).

Hall of Famer Art Donovan had this to say about Bill George: "It's real hard to make the call, but the best linebacker I've ever seen play may have been the Bears' George.  He was wild; he'd psyche himself up into a frenzy when he played.  Then you'd meet him off the field and he was a completely different guy, another Clark Kent.  And he'd line up anywhere on the field.... Quarterbacks would be going out of their mind looking to find out where the hell Bill George was."

In addition to his 18 career interceptions, George also recovered 19 fumbles, and in 1954 scored 25 points on 13 PATs and four field goals.  In 1963, he led the Bears defense when they won the NFL Championship.

George was elected to the Pro Football Hall of Fame in 1974.  The Bears retired his uniform number 61. Three of his successors as Chicago middle linebackers are also in the Hall of Fame: Dick Butkus (1965-73), Mike Singletary (1981-92) and Brian Urlacher (2000-12). 

In a 1989 article, in which he named his choices for the best athletes ever to wear each uniform number from 0 to 99, Sports Illustrated columnist Rick Reilly not only chose George for number 61, but called him "the meanest Bear ever," no small thing considering the franchise's long history and reputation for toughness.  In 1999, he was ranked number 49 on The Sporting News''' list of the 100 Greatest Football Players.  George was killed in an automobile accident in Rockford, Illinois on September 30, 1982. He was buried at Evergreen Cemetery in Barrington.

References

Bibliography
 Carroll, Bob, Gershman, Michael, Neft, David, and Thorn, John, Total Football II: The Official Encyclopedia of the National Football League, Harper Collins, 1999, page 822.
 Halas, George, Morgan, Gwen, and Veysey, Arthur, Halas by Halas, McGraw-Hill, 1979.
 Rand, Jonathan, Riddell Presents The Gridiron's Greatest Linebackers, Sports Publishing, 2003.
 Youmans, Gary and Youmans, Maury, 63, The Story of the 1963 World Champion Chicago Bears'', Campbell Road Press, 2004.

External links
 

1929 births
1982 deaths
American football linebackers
Chicago Bears players
Los Angeles Rams players
Wake Forest Demon Deacons football players
National Football League players with retired numbers
Pro Football Hall of Fame inductees
Western Conference Pro Bowl players
People from Waynesburg, Pennsylvania
Players of American football from Pennsylvania
Road incident deaths in Illinois